Horacio Siburu Libarona (18 March 1922 – 10 April 2000) was an Argentine modern pentathlete. He competed at the 1948 Summer Olympics.

References

External links
 

1922 births
2000 deaths
Argentine male modern pentathletes
Olympic modern pentathletes of Argentina
Modern pentathletes at the 1948 Summer Olympics
People from Concordia, Entre Ríos
Sportspeople from Entre Ríos Province